Whittier is a city in Southern California in Los Angeles County, part of the Gateway Cities. The  city had 87,306 residents as of the 2020 United States census, an increase of 1,975 from the 2010 census figure. Whittier was incorporated in February 1898 and became a charter city in 1955. The city is named for the Quaker poet John Greenleaf Whittier and is home to Whittier College.

Etymology
In the founding days of Whittier, when it was a small isolated town, Jonathan Bailey and his wife, Rebecca, were among the first residents. They followed the Quaker religious faith and practice, and held religious meetings on their porch. Other early settlers, such as Aquila Pickering, espoused the Quaker faith. As the city grew, the citizens named it after John Greenleaf Whittier, a respected Quaker poet, and deeded a lot to him. Whittier wrote a dedication poem, and is honored today with statues and a small exhibit at the Whittier museum; a statue of him sits in Whittier's Central Park, and another representing his poem "The Barefoot Boy" used to reside by the City Hall and is now in front of the main library.  Whittier never set foot there, but the city still bears his name and is rooted in the Quaker tradition.

History

Whittier's roots can be traced to Spanish soldier Manuel Nieto. The area of Nieto's land grant was reduced in 1790 as the result of a dispute with Mission San Gabriel. Nonetheless, Nieto still had claim to  stretching from the hills north of Whittier, Fullerton, and Brea, south to the Pacific Ocean, and from what is known today as the Los Angeles River east to the Santa Ana River. Nieto built a rancho for his family near Whittier, and purchased cattle and horses for his ranch and also planted cornfields. When Nieto died in 1804,  his children inherited their father's property.

At the time of the 1840s Mexican–American War, much of the land that would become Whittier was owned by Pio Pico, a rancher and the last Mexican governor of Alta California. Pio Pico built a hacienda here on the San Gabriel River, known today as Pio Pico State Historic Park. Following the Mexican–American War, German immigrant Jacob F. Gerkens paid $234 to the U.S. government to acquire  of land under the Homestead Act and built the cabin known today as the Jonathan Bailey House. Gerkens would later become the first chief of police of the Los Angeles Police Department. The area soon became known as a thriving citrus ranching region, with "Quaker Brand" fruit being shipped all over the United States. Beginning in 1887, walnut trees were planted, and Whittier became the largest walnut grower in the United States. In addition to walnuts and citrus, Whittier was also a major producer of pampas grass.

For many years, the sole means of transport from this area to Los Angeles was on foot, or via horse and wagon over rough dirt roads, impeding settlement, development, and the export of agriculture. Thus in 1887 "enterprising and aggressive businessmen" contracted with the Southern Pacific Railroad to build the first railroad spur to Whittier, including a depot. The businessmen covered the $43,000 construction cost for the six-mile spur, which branched off from the Southern Pacific mainline at a junction near what is now Studebaker Road between Firestone Boulevard and Imperial Highway. By 1906, 650 carloads of oranges and 250 carloads of lemons were shipped annually by rail. In 1904, the Pacific Electric opened the trolley line known as "Big Red Cars" from Los Angeles to Whittier. In the first two decades, over a million passengers a year rode to and from Los Angeles on the Whittier Line. After World War II, Whittier grew rapidly and the sub-dividing of orange groves began, driven by housing shortages in southern California. In 1955, the new Civic Center complex was completed and the City Council met in new chambers for the first time on March 8, 1955. The city continued to grow as the City annexed portions of Whittier Boulevard and East Whittier. The 1961 annexation added over 28,000 people to the population, bringing the total to about 67,000.

Quakers

The first Quaker meetings were held on the front porch of the Jonathan Bailey House. Eventually, as more Quakers arrived, the need for an actual Meeting House arose and the first Quaker meeting house was built on the corner of Comstock Avenue and Wardman Street in 1887. The meeting soon outgrew this 100-seat meeting house and a new larger building was erected on the corner of Philadelphia Street and Washington Avenue in 1902. By 1912, membership had grown to 1,200 and a third building was dedicated on the same site in 1917. With a capacity of 1,700, the 1917 meeting house featured a balcony and was constructed of brick with mahogany paneling and pews. The present meeting house, dedicated in 1975, features many architectural elements and materials from the 1917 building including the stained glass windows and mahogany interior. The Quakers also founded Whittier Academy (later Whittier College), and additional meetings met in East Whittier and at Whittier College's Mendenhall. Both the Mendenhall meeting and the East Whittier meeting kept the silent meeting longer than the main church.

Colleges

In 1887 the Pickering Land and Water Company set aside a  parcel of land for the development of a college, but a collapse in the land boom stalled construction. Progress on developing a college was sporadic, but on July 30, 1896, the Whittier Academy, operating since 1891, officially changed its name to Whittier College with 100 students enrolled. The school mascot is "The Poet." By 1906, Whittier College was an educational institution with laboratories, boarding halls, a large gymnasium and athletic fields. Due to an economic depression in the 1890s, the first bachelor's degrees were not awarded at the college for 17 years.

The Mendenhall Building at Whittier College was donated by Leona May Mendenhall in honor of her husband Oscar. The Mendenhalls were among the founding families of Whittier. Oscar's brother, Samuel Mendenhall, helped bring in the water system and post office. The Mendenhalls were large growers for Sunkist oranges and Blue Diamond walnuts.

Whittier was the first home to Azusa Pacific University, established on March 3, 1899, by the Quaker community and a Methodist evangelist under the name Training School for Christian Workers.

Whittier Narrows earthquake

On October 1, 1987, at 7:42 a.m., the Whittier Narrows earthquake struck, the epicenter being six miles (10 km) north by northwest of Whittier. The seismic event, which registered 5.9 on the moment magnitude scale, killed eight people and damaged many of uptown Whittier's historic buildings. Three days later, on October 4, 1987, at 3:59 a.m., a major aftershock measuring 5.2 caused further damage. Buildings and residential structures which were already borderline unsafe were now deemed unsafe or  uninhabitable. In the years following the earthquake, the city's deteriorating uptown business district became the focus of renewed development, which met with opposition from many Whittier citizens. The Whittier Conservancy was formed in 1987 in an effort to stop the demolition of many historic buildings and residences after the disaster. The city also created a Historic Resources Commission to oversee the approval of historic designations, historic districts and Mills Act proposals. The Whittier Narrows earthquake also destroyed The Quad at Whittier, a shopping mall which had to be rebuilt.

Geography

Whittier is bordered by the community of Hacienda Heights to the northeast, City of Industry to the north, and several other unincorporated communities in the San Gabriel Valley mostly along its northern sections. Pico Rivera lies at the west, La Habra Heights to the east, La Habra to the southeast and Santa Fe Springs to the south.

Neighborhoods
There are several neighborhoods in Whittier. The area centered around Philadelphia Street and Greenleaf Avenue is known as Uptown Whittier and contains the traditional central business core. Just north of Uptown Whittier are the neighborhoods known as Central Park and Hadley-Greenleaf. They have been designated historic districts by the city Historic Resources Commission, and together comprise most of the area of the Whittier Historic Neighborhood Association. These districts contain many Craftsman and Spanish Colonial Revival homes. In and abutting the hills north of the historic districts is Starlite Estates.  The area surrounding Whittier College is known as College Hills and was also recently designated a historic district, as has a small cluster of homes along Earlham Drive. The area east of College Avenue is referred to as East Whittier. East Whittier was a separate agricultural community until the postwar era. The eastern parts of East Whittier, developed in the 1950s and 1960s, are known as Friendly Hills, which was developed at the same time as Murphy Ranch and Leffingwell Ranch.

Climate 
Winter daytime highs typically range from 68 °F to 80 °F (20 °C to 27 °C) with overnight lows dropping to about 43 °F to 54 °F (6° to 12 °C). In the summer highs range from 78 °F to 95 °F (26 °C to 35 °C) and corresponding overnight lows in the 58 °F to 72 °F (14 °C to 22 °C). Rainfall follows a Mediterranean pattern with most rain falling during the winter months, while summers tend to be rather dry.

Demographics

2020
The 2020 United States census reported that Whittier had a total population of 87,306 people with a density of 5,824.9 people per square mile. The racial makeup of the city was 48.7% White (24.5% Non-Hispanic white, 24.2% White Hispanic), 1.5% African American, 1.1% Native American, 5.3% Asian, 0.0% Asian Pacific American, and 8.4% from two or more races. Hispanic and Latino Americans were 65.8% of the population. 16.6% of the population were foreign born, and 3.1% of people were veterans.

There were 27,093 households, of which the average size was 3.07 persons. The median household income during 2016–2020 was $76,026, and 9.5% of the population was living in poverty.

The population was spread out, with 23.0% of the population under the age of 18 and 15.1% above the age of 65. Of all people aged above 25 years, 88.5% were high school graduates, and 26.7% had a bachelor's degree or higher. 61.5% of people aged above 16 years were in the civilian labor force.

2010
The 2010 United States Census reported that Whittier had a population of 85,331. The racial makeup of Whittier was 55,117 (64.6%) White (28.3% Non-Hispanic White, 36.3% White Hispanic), 1,092 (1.3%) African American, 1,093 (1.3%) Native American, 3,262 (3.8%) Asian, 123 (0.1%) Pacific Islander, 20,848 (24.4%) from other races, and 3,796 (4.4%) from two or more races. Hispanic or Latino of any race were 56,081 persons (65.7%).

The Census reported that 83,696 people (98.1% of the population) lived in households, 1,083 (1.3%) lived in non-institutionalized group quarters, and 552 (0.6%) were institutionalized.

There were 28,273 households, out of which 11,289 (39.9%) had children under the age of 18 living in them, 14,152 (50.1%) were opposite-sex married couples living together, 4,566 (16.1%) had a female householder with no husband present, 1,896 (6.7%) had a male householder with no wife present. There were 1,770 (6.3%) unmarried opposite-sex partnerships, and 247 (0.9%) same-sex married couples or partnerships. 6,096 households (21.6%) were made up of individuals, and 2,495 (8.8%) had someone living alone who was 65 years of age or older. The average household size was 2.96.  There were 20,614 families (72.9% of all households); the average family size was 3.46.

The population was spread out, with 21,686 people (25.4%) under the age of 18, 9,198 people (10.8%) aged 18 to 24, 23,627 people (27.7%) aged 25 to 44, 20,819 people (24.4%) aged 45 to 64, and 10,001 people (11.7%) who were 65 years of age or older.  The median age was 35.4 years. For every 100 females, there were 94.0 males. For every 100 females age 18 and over, there were 90.5 males.

The homeowner vacancy rate was 1.3%; the rental vacancy rate was 5.1%. 49,393 people (57.9% of the population) lived in owner-occupied housing units and 34,303 people (40.2%) lived in rental housing units.

During 2009–2013, Whittier had a median household income of $68,522, with 12.4% of the population living below the federal poverty line.

2000
As of the census of 2000, there were 83,680 people, 28,271 households, and 20,468 families residing in the city. The population density was 5,719.4 inhabitants per square mile (2,208.4/km2). The racial makeup of the city was 43.2% White, 1.2% African American, 1.3% Native American, 3.3% Asian, 0.2% Pacific Islander, 25.8% from other races, and 5.0% from two or more races. Hispanic or Latino of any race were 65.9% of the population.

There were 28,271 households, out of which 37.8% had children under the age of 18 living with them, 52.5% were married couples living together, 14.3% had a female householder with no husband present, and 27.6% were non-families. 22.4% of all households were made up of individuals, and 9.4% had someone living alone who was 65 years of age or older. The average household size was 2.88 and the average family size was 3.38.

In the city, the population was spread out, with 28.3% under the age of 18, 10.0% from 18 to 24, 30.6% from 25 to 44, 18.6% from 45 to 64, and 12.5% who were 65 years of age or older. The median age was 33 years. For every 100 females, there were 94.6 males. For every 100 females age 18 and over, there were 90.1 males.

The median income for a household in the city was $49,256, and the median income for a family was $55,726. Males had a median income of $40,394 versus $34,223 for females. The per capita income for the city was $21,409. About 7.8% of families and 10.5% of the population were below the poverty line, including 13.7% of those under age 18 and 8.0% of those age 65 or over.

Economy
Whittier's Redevelopment Agency has numerous projects underway to revitalize the community. This includes a $7 million project near the historic Hoover Hotel.

The Whittwood Town Center (formerly the Whittwood Mall) anchored by JC Penney, Target, PetSmart, Sears, Vons, and Kohl's has made way for Red Robin and Chick-fil-A. The city still waits to attract more well known businesses and open new residential town homes with the revival of its Uptown district.

In addition, the agency is working on developing a  project area near Whittier Blvd. The master plan was adopted in June 2005 by the City Council. In 2019, Whittier's first food hall, Poet Gardens, opened in Uptown Whittier.

Top employers
According to the city's 2013 Comprehensive Annual Financial Report, the top employers in the city are:

Arts and culture
On April 17, 1900, the Whittier Public Library Board of Trustees held its first meeting in Landrum Smith's drugstore. With an initial collection of 60 books and 200 magazines, the library facilities began in the Woody Building as a reading room, maintained by Mr. Hester in exchange for space for his telegraph office. In 1907, a Carnegie grant funded the construction of the building at Bailey and Greenleaf that many Whittierites fondly remember. As the city expanded, a larger library was needed, and the Friends of the Library organized in 1956 to raise money for a new building. Through their efforts, and those of the board members, librarians, and citizen fund raising groups, the new library was completed at the Washington Avenue site in May 1959. In 1968, service was further expanded with the construction of the Whittwood Branch Library on Santa Gertrudes Avenue.

Historical landmarks and entertainment locations

 Rose Hills Memorial Park, the largest single-location cemetery in the world, is located just outside the city western edge in unincorporated Whittier.
 Whittier is home to the following California Historical Landmarks
 Pio Pico State Historic Park, California Historical Landmark No. 127: The Casa de Governor Pío Pico/Home of Governor Pío Pico, home of the last Mexican Governor of California.
 California Historical Landmark No. 646: Grave of George Caralambo, (Greek George). Grave marker is located at the Whittier Museum :
 California Historical Landmark No. 681: Paradox Hybrid Walnut Tree:
 California Historical Landmark No. 947: Reform School for Juvenile Offenders (Fred C. Nelles School  — Closed May 27, 2004 and currently being redeveloped for business and residential use)
 Whittier Museum - 6755 Newlin Ave, Whittier 90601. Open for public tour Fridays and Saturdays from 1 to 4 p.m. and is free of charge
 Whittier is the home to the following places listed in the National Register of Historic Places:
 Pio Pico House, 6003 Pioneer Blvd.
 Hoover Hotel, 7035 Greenleaf Ave.
 Southern Pacific Railroad Depot, 7333 Greenleaf Ave.
 Standard Oil Building, 7257 Bright Ave.
 Jonathan Bailey House, 13421 E. Camilla St.
 National Bank of Whittier Building, 13002 E. Philadelphia
 Orin Jordan House, 8310 S. Comstock Ave.

Government

City government
Whittier uses a council–manager form of government. Until 2014, all five city council members were elected at-large with the mayor being elected by the council. Following the 2016 elections, four members of the city council were elected in districts to four-year terms, whereas the mayor is directly elected to two-year terms. The council also appoints a city manager.

The current mayor of Whittier is Joe Vinatieri. The city council is currently made up of Fernando Dutra, Octavio Martinez, Cathy Warner, and mayor pro tempore Jessica Martinez. Brian Saeki is currently serving as the city manager, with Shannon DeLong as the assistant city manager.

Federal and state representation

Education

The city of Whittier is served by the Whittier Union High School District, East Whittier City School District, Whittier City School District, Lowell Joint School District

Five high schools, California High School, La Serna High School, Pioneer High School, Santa Fe High School, and Whittier High School comprise the Whittier Union High School District. There is one alternative continuation high school Frontier High School and a homeschooling hq, Sierra Vista High School. Although they still have Whittier postal addresses, both California High School and Pioneer High School lie outside the city limits in unincorporated Los Angeles County. Santa Fe High School is located within the City of Santa Fe Springs. Adults may attend the Whittier Adult School, which belongs to the Whittier Union High School District.
The city also has three private Catholic elementary schools, K-8
 St. Bruno's Parish School
 St Gregory The Great Parish School
 St. Mary of the Assumption School

The schools are operated by the Roman Catholic Archdiocese of Los Angeles with one (St. Mary of the Assumption School) being one of the largest Catholic elementary schools in Los Angeles County. St Gregory The Great School has been Number One in their deanery for the Academic Decathlon two years in a row.

Whittier Friends School  is a member of the Friends Council on Education  and associated with First Friends Church of Whittier, the founding Quaker meeting of Whittier. Whittier Friends School includes a licensed preschool and an elementary school (TK-6th grade).

Trinity Lutheran School, a ministry of Trinity Lutheran Church, serves kindergarten through eighth grade.

Whittier Christian School, a ministry of Calvary Baptist Church, Association of Christian Schools International serves the Whittier community. They  have an Elementary campus, two Preschool campuses, one Junior High, and one High School.

Plymouth Christian School, a ministry of Plymouth Church, serves preschool through sixth grade.

Higher education institutions in the area include Rio Hondo College, which lies just outside the city, Southern California University of Health Sciences, and historic Whittier College.

Media
The local newspaper is the Whittier Daily News. Other area papers include the San Gabriel Valley Tribune, the parent paper of the Whittier Daily News, the Los Angeles Times and the Orange County Register. Music fanzine Los Angeles Flipside published locally from 1977 to 1990. Former newspaper include: Coast Reporter, Whittier Californian, Whittier Graphic, Whittier Star Reporter, and more.

Infrastructure
The Los Angeles County Department of Health Services operates the Whittier Health Center in Whittier.

At one time the California Youth Authority operated the Fred C. Nelles Youth Correctional Facility. The center, which started operations in 1890, closed on May 27, 2004.

Transportation

There are a variety of bus routes operating within the city with Metro, Foothill Transit, Montebello Bus Lines and the Norwalk Transit being the leading bus lines used within the city. Foothill Transit line 274 originates at Beverly & Norwalk, then proceeds north to Baldwin Park via Workman Mill Road and Puente Avenue. Foothill Transit line 285 travels through Whittier on Whittier Boulevard and Colima Road between La Habra and Hacienda Heights. Montebello Transit Line 10 originates at Whittwood Mall, then proceeds west to Montebello and the Atlantic L Line station via Whittier Boulevard. Montebello 40 originates at Beverly and Norwalk, then proceeds west to Montebello and Downtown Los Angeles via Beverly Boulevard and 4th Street. Montebello 50 travels through Whittier between La Mirada and Downtown Los Angeles. Metro Bus line 121 originates at Whittwood Mall and travels west to the Norwalk C Line station, then to the Aviation C line station via Imperial Hwy. Metro Bus line 270 runs through North, Uptown and West Whittier on its way between Monrovia and the Norwalk Green Line station. The Sunshine Shuttle is a circular serving Whittier and the unincorporated communities of South and West Whittier

The city also has a variety of roads. One freeway, the San Gabriel River Freeway (I-605) runs right along the northern end of the city. State Route 72 runs via Whittier Boulevard and forms part of El Camino Real. Other major streets in Whittier include Beverly Boulevard, Colima Road, Greenleaf Avenue, Lambert Road, Mar Vista Street, Mills Avenue, Norwalk Boulevard, Painter Avenue, Philadelphia Street and Washington Boulevard.

Police
Law enforcement services are provided by the Whittier Police Department

Fire
There are three fire stations within Whittier city limits: Los Angeles County Fire Department Station 28 (Engine, Quint, Paramedic Squad, Mobile Aid, and the Battalion Chief), Station 17 (Engine), Station 59 (Engine and EST).

Fred C. Nelles Youth Correctional Facility

The Fred C. Nelles Youth Correctional Facility served as a state reform school for boys and girls until 1916, when the girls were moved elsewhere. 
Opened in 1891 before Whittier was incorporated, Nelles was the longest-running state school for juvenile offenders in California and has been declared a California State Historical Landmark. It closed on May 27, 2004, and the facility was used as a television filming site.  In 2014, Brookfield Residential Properties announced plans for a large retail, commercial and residential project on the site. Much of Whittier is built out  so the  site brings a unique chance for growth in the city. Although over 50 buildings were demolished, discussions have focused on how many of the eight historic buildings should be preserved. The administration building that was constructed in 1928–29, has its own historical designation. Housing and commercial space are under construction on the site.

Notable people

George Allen, former Virginia governor and U.S. Senator 
Glenn Allison, professional ten-pin bowler and member of the PBA and USBC Halls of Fame
Deborah Babashoff, swimmer
Shirley Babashoff, swimmer, winner of eight Olympic medals
Andrea Barber, actress, Full House/Fuller House
Mitch Callahan, former prospect for the Detroit Red Wings
Raymond F. Chandler III, SMA, US Army, former Sergeant Major of the US Army
Carl Cheffers, NFL referee
Tricia Nixon Cox, daughter of President Richard Nixon
Jeff B. Davis, comedian and actor
Justin De Fratus, pitcher for Philadelphia Phillies
M.F.K. Fisher, food writer
Nomar Garciaparra, professional baseball player
Jeff Loveness, American screenwriter and producer
John Gay, screenwriter
Matt Gourley, American comedic actor, writer, and teacher
Greg Hancock, American Speedway rider
Wally Hood, baseball player, member of Pacific Coast League Hall of Fame
Lou Henry Hoover, wife of  U.S. president Herbert Hoover
 Gabriel Iglesias, comedian
Tinker Juarez, professional cyclist, two-time Olympian, MTB Hall of Fame, BMX Hall of Fame, national champion, World Master MTB Champion
Melissa King, chef specializing in modern Californian cuisine, finalist on Top Chef: Season 12
Mark Kostabi, artist and composer
Paul Kostabi, artist and musician
John Lasseter, co-founder of Pixar Animation Studios and film director
Carey Lovelace, art writer and curator
Miller grew up in Whittier.
Pat Nixon, First Lady of the United States, wife of Richard Nixon, whom she met while teaching English at Whittier High School
Richard Nixon, 37th President of the United States, attended and played football at Whittier High School and Whittier College; Whittier was his childhood home, and he is buried in Yorba Linda in nearby Orange County, where he was born
Dax Reynosa, a hip hop and smooth jazz musician and producer
Zane Reynosa, hip hop musician and fashion accessory designer
Douglas Robinson, professor of English, dean
Michael Vernon Robinson, automobile designer
John Saul, suspense and horror novelist
Ron Shelton, film director and screenwriter
Lauren Tewes, actress, grew up in Whittier
Stu Thomsen, professional BMX racer
Aaron Valdes (born 1993), basketball player in the Israeli Basketball Premier League
Melissa Villaseñor, comedian, actress and singer
Tom Waits, musician, composer, songwriter and actor
Jessamyn West, author of The Friendly Persuasion
Del Worsham, NHRA funny car and top fuel driver, 2011 Top Fuel World Champion
Tina Yothers, actress and singer

Film and television locations
Various notable movies and television shows have been filmed in the city including:
Gardens of the Night (2008) – Film starring Gillian Jacobs, John Malkovich, Ryan Simpkins and Tom Arnold. Scenes were filmed in Michael's Super Burgers.
Masters of the Universe (1987) - Film starring Frank Langella. Key battle scenes in a music store and on rooftops during Skeletor's invasion of Earth were shot here, among others.
Amish Grace (2010) – Television film. The carriage procession was filmed on Greenleaf St. in Uptown Whittier and funeral home scene was filmed at The Good Shepherd Family Bible Church, across the street from the post office on Bailey St.
Back to the Future (1985) and Back to the Future Part II (1989) – Films starring Michael J. Fox. Whittier High School was used as the setting for Hill Valley High School.
Hocus Pocus (1993) – Film starring Bette Midler, Sarah Jessica Parker, Thora Birch and Vinessa Shaw. Parts were filmed in Uptown Whittier and East Whittier Middle School.
Father of the Bride Part II (1995) – Film starring Steve Martin. Parts were filmed in uptown Whittier.
The Wonder Years (1988–1993) – Television series starring Fred Savage. The parade scene in the last episode was filmed in uptown Whittier.
The Next Best Thing (2000) – Film starring Madonna and Rupert Everett was filmed in the Whittier Hills.
Bringing Down the House (2003) – Film starring Queen Latifah and Steve Martin was filmed at the Friendly Hills Country Club, in East Whittier.
Terminator 3: Rise of the Machines (2003) – Film starring Arnold Schwarzenegger. Various parts were shot in Whittier including in Rose Hills Memorial Park.
Blow (2001) – Film starring Johnny Depp and Penélope Cruz. Scenes were filmed at the Fred C. Nelles Youth Correctional Facility, which closed in January 2004, and in a residential neighborhood.
Ali (2001) – Directed by Michael Mann, portions of which were filmed at a residence in the historic neighborhood near the uptown village.
Disturbia (2007) – Film starring Shia LaBeouf, Carrie-Anne Moss, and Amanda Walsh. Was shot on Painter Ave, the deli scenes were filmed at "Our Cleaners" on Comstock Ave. in uptown Whittier.
Moonlight (2007–2008) – Television series starring Alex O'Loughlin and Sophia Myles. Exteriors of a state execution facility were filmed at the Fred C. Nelles Youth Correctional Facility, the facility name being clearly shown in multiple shots.
What Just Happened? (2008) – Film starring Robert De Niro, Bruce Willis, Sean Penn and Robin Wright Penn. Scenes were filmed in Rose Hills Memorial Park.
Red State (2011) – Film directed by Kevin Smith and starring Michael Parks. Scenes were filmed at the Fred C. Nelles Youth Correctional Facility and Trinity Lutheran Church. 
True Blood (2008–2014) – Several scenes of involving The Fellowship of the Sun church were filmed at the chapel at Rose Hills Memorial Park. On the DVD commentary of Season 3, Stephen Moyer says several local girls came to the filming with shirts saying, "The girls are prettier in Whittier".
Roadracers (1994) – Film starring David Arquette, John Hawkes, and Salma Hayek; directed by Robert Rodriguez. Much of the filming took place in Uptown, the nearby residential neighborhoods, and Turnbull Canyon Road. John Hawkes describes in an interview, "We shot anywhere we could find something that looked like the 1950s. It was difficult near L.A. It was hard to find things that looked authentic to the period and a small Texas town. I think they did a good job finding [the locations]."
The Muppets (2011) – Film starring Amy Adams and Jason Segel. Scenes at the beginning, of Walter and Gary's hometown, were shot in a residential area of historic Uptown Whittier.
Old Boyfriends (1979) - Film starring Talia Shire, Richard Jordan, Keith Carradine, John Belushi, John Houseman and Buck Henry. Scenes with Talia Shire and Keith Carradine were shot near Central Park in historic Uptown Whittier.
The Little Things (2021) – Film starring Denzel Washington, Rami Malek, and Jared Leto. Scenes were shot in uptown on Bright Ave.

Sister cities
 Changshu, Jiangsu, China

See also

 South Whittier, California (an unincorporated area south of the city limits)
 West Whittier-Los Nietos, California (an unincorporated area west of the city limits)
 East Whittier, California (an unincorporated area east of the city limits)
 Rose Hills, California (an unincorporated area north of the city limits)
 Los Angeles
 Puente Hills
 Paradox Hybrid Walnut Tree in Whittier

References

External links

 
 Whittier Public Library
 Whittier Chamber of Commerce

 
1898 establishments in California
Chicano and Mexican neighborhoods in California
Cities in Los Angeles County, California
Incorporated cities and towns in California
Gateway Cities
Populated places established in 1898